Kevin Ross  (born December 8, 1987) is an American singer, songwriter and producer. He previously was signed to Motown Records and he released his debut album The Awakening in March 2017. Ross is also an award-winning songwriter, having written songs for artists such as Trey Songz, Nicki Minaj, Jamie Foxx, SWV, Johnny Gill and Toni Braxton. He began to become well known in 2014 after being featured in a Glade holiday campaign   that year, charting with his version of the song "This Is My Wish".

Early life

Born and raised in the DMV area, Ross comes from a family full of musicians. As a child, he was heavily influenced by his father's side of the family who all sung and played musical instruments. He attended the Duke Ellington School of the Arts, a performing arts high school in Washington, D.C. After covering songs from Stevie Wonder in a Motown tribute during his sophomore year, Ross knew he wanted to pursue a career as a musician. Following high school, he accepted a scholarship to the prestigious Berklee College of Music in Boston, where he studied contemporary writing and production.

Career 
While attending Berklee, Ross appeared on BET's 106 and Park's as part of the shows Wild Out Wednesday competition. Ross ended up winning the competition and through his win, caught the attention of executive producer and music industry veteran Troy Taylor. After graduating from Berklee College, Ross moved to Atlanta where he began his songwriting career. After successfully landing several songwriting placements  with Trey Songz, Jamie Foxx, and other platinum artists, Kevin signed a recording deal with Motown Records.

2014–2017: Motown and The Awakening

Kevin's first solo release on Motown, Dialogue in the Grey, was released in 2014. The 4-track EP, which featured appearances by Ne-Yo and T.I, allowed Kevin the opportunity to tour nationally as the opening act for Maxwell's Summer Soulstice tour  and Ne-Yo's One Night With Ne-Yo tour. That same year, Ross became the face of Glade's "This Is My Wish" holiday campaign. After having a breakout year, AOL named Kevin Ross their "Best New Artist" for 2014. In 2015, Kevin announced the release of his long-awaited debut album on Motown, The Awakening however, the project would not be released until 2017. During that time, Kevin held his audience over by creating his 1990s R&B mash up series. The mash-up series ended up becoming popular on social media and introduced Kevin to a whole new audience. In 2016, Ross released his first official single from this debut album entitled "Long Song Away". The single peaked at No.1 on Billboard's Adult R&B Song chart  and radio's Urban Adult Contemporary chart, making him the first debut Motown recording artist since 2010 to accomplish that feat. Kevin's debut album, The Awakening, was officially released on March 24, 2017 on the Motown/Verve record label and it features appearances from Chaz French, BJ the Chicago Kid, Lecrae and production from Babyface. On September 17, 2017, Ross announced the release of his third EP, Drive.

2018–present: Motown Exit and Audacity

After the release of Drive, Ross took a brief hiatus from the music industry. In January 2019, he reemerge and announced his exit from his recording label Motown and the creation of his own label, Art Society Music Group. When asked his reason for leaving Motown, Ross says "I wanted to have the freedom to decide who I am doing co-ventures with. It’s just like in any kind of business, when you have too many cooks that’s within the kitchen, sometimes you don’t get the best result, especially when everyone doesn’t have the same end goal in mind. Everyone can have great intentions, but if you’re not on the same page, good intentions are kind of pointless." In addition to the new label, Ross announced that a new single, Thing Called Love, and a new album, Audacity, will be released in the spring of 2019, but the release was postponed. In December 2019, Ross announced the release of the 7-track EP Audacity, Vol. 1 on January 31, 2020.

Discography

Studio albums

EPs

Singles

Tours
Headlining
 The Awakening Tour (2017)

Supporting
 Summer Soulstice Tour w/ Maxwell (2014) 
 One Night with Ne-Yo Tour w/ Ne-Yo (2014)
 BET Music Matters Tour (2015)
 XIX Tour w/ Ro James (2017)
 NYLA Tour w/ Marsha Ambrosius (2019)
 Full Circle Tour w/ Babyface & KEM (2022)

Writing and Production Discography
This is a list of the songs known to have been written/co-written and produced by Kevin Ross.

Awards and nominations

External links

References

Living people
Motown artists
Berklee College of Music alumni
1987 births
African-American male singer-songwriters
Entertainers from Washington, D.C.
American producers
21st-century African-American male singers
Singer-songwriters from Washington, D.C.